In the mathematical field of functional analysis, a Gelfand–Shilov space  is a space of test functions for the theory of generalized functions, introduced by .

References

 
 

Functional analysis
Generalized functions
Schwartz distributions
Topological vector spaces